Millie Mai McKenzie (born 17 June 2000) is an English professional wrestler. She is mostly known for her time in WWE where she performed on the NXT UK brand under the ring name Emilia McKenzie. She has also wrestled in promotions in Defiant Wrestling, Progress Wrestling, Revolution Pro Wrestling, Sendai Girls' Pro Wrestling.

Professional wrestling career

Progress Wrestling (2017–2019)
McKenzie made her debut for Progress Wrestling on 10 October 2017 in Progress Women's Title #1 Contendership Tournament First, being defeated by Sierra Loxton, and that same night losing in the second round to Jinny. At Chapter 60: Unboxing Live! 2 - Unbox Harder, McKenzie defeated Candyfloss, Chakara, Charlie Morgan, Charli Evans and Sierra Loxton.

Revolution Pro Wrestling (2018)
On 6 January 2018, McKenzie made her debut for Revolution Pro Wrestling competed in the RPW British Women's Championship. She defeated Charli Evans in the first round. The next day, McKenzie was eliminated by Jinny in the second round.

WWE (2018)
McKenzie took part in the NXT UK program as part of the United Kingdom division. She would then enter a tournament for the inaugural NXT UK Women's Championship, where she was defeated by Jinny in the first round. On 9 June 2019, it was announced that McKenzie had rejected a WWE contract at the beginning of that year.

Sendai Girls' Pro Wrestling (2019)
On 6 January 2019, McKenzie made her Sendai Girls' Pro Wrestling debut, defeating Ayame Sasamura to become the Sendai Girls Junior Champion.

Return to WWE (2021–2022)
On 16 February 2021, it was announced that McKenzie had signed a contract to WWE. On 8 April, under the ring name Emilia McKenzie, she teamed with Meiko Satomura to defeat Kay Lee Ray and Isla Dawn in her return match in NXT UK.

On 18 August 2022, McKenzie was released from her WWE contract.

Personal life

Allegations against Travis Banks
While a trainer at Fight Club Pro, Travis Banks entered into a relationship with 17 year old trainee McKenzie. Banks was 30 at the time. McKenzie later accused Banks of abusing his position of trust and authority to manipulate her, putting her through mental and emotional hurt and harassing her. Banks was let go. She accused him of doing the same to other trainees. Banks admitted to the relationship with his trainee.

Championships and accomplishments 
Defiant Wrestling
Defiant Women's Championship (1 time)
Fight Forever Wrestling
Fight Forever Women's World Championship (1 time)
Ironfist Wrestling
Ironfist Women's Championship (1 time)
Pro-Wrestling: EVE
Pro-Wrestling: EVE Tag Team Championship (1 time) - with Charli Evans
SHE-1 (2019)
Pro Wrestling Revolver
PWR Tag Team Championship (1 time) – with Pete Dunne
REACH Wrestling
REACH Women's Championship (1 time)
RIPTIDE Wrestling
 Brighton Spirit Tag Team Trophy (1 time) - with Charli Evans
Sendai Girls' Pro Wrestling
Sendai Girls Junior Championship (1 time)
Sendai Girls World Tag Team Championship (1 time) - with Charli Evans
WrestlingKULT
Women of Kult Championship (1 time)

References

External links

2000 births
Living people
21st-century professional wrestlers
English female professional wrestlers
Sportspeople from Coventry
English expatriate sportspeople in Japan